Kharehju (also Romanized as Kharehjū; also known as Kharehchū) is a village in Mangur-e Sharqi Rural District, Khalifan District, Mahabad County, West Azerbaijan Province, Iran. At the 2006 census, its population was 150, in 15 families.

References 

Populated places in Mahabad County